Francesco Venier was the Doge of Venice from 1554 to 1556.

See also
 House of Venier

References

Francis
16th-century Doges of Venice